Final results for the water polo competition at the 1972 Summer Olympics held in Munich.

Qualification

Medalists

Squads

Preliminary round

Pool A

Pool B

Pool C

Final round

Group II (Classification 7th – 12th) 

Results taken from Preliminary Round

Group I  (Classification Gold – 6th)

Results taken from Preliminary Round

Final ranking

Top goalscorers

See also
1973 FINA Men's World Water Polo Championship

References

Sources
 PDF documents in the LA84 Foundation Digital Library:
 Official Report of the 1972 Olympic Games, v.3 (download, archive) (pp. 331, 353–365)
 Water polo on the Olympedia website
 Water polo at the 1972 Summer Olympics (men's tournament)
 Water polo on the Sports Reference website
 Water polo at the 1972 Summer Games (men's tournament) (archived)

External links

Official Olympic Report

 
1972 Summer Olympics events
1972
O
1972